George Henry Jackson (1847–1925) was a Canadian-born American politician, lawyer, educator, and businessman. He served in the Ohio House of Representatives for Hamilton County, from 1892 to 1893. He was a Republican.

Biography 
George Henry Jackson was born October 4, 1847 in Ontario, Canada, to parents Julia (née Burke) and George. His grandparents were Black and had been enslaved by the Custis family in Arlington, Virginia. Jackson was raised in Lafayette, Indiana, and in Cincinnati, Ohio. He studied teaching under Peter Clark.

In his early career he taught at schools in the Ohio Valley. He married Virginia Gordon in 1879, and his father in-law was Robert Gordon a wealthy Cincinnati coal dealer. He attended Shaw University, and Yale University. Jackson started practicing law in 1884. He served in the Ohio House of Representatives for Hamilton County, from 1892 to 1893.

Jackson was a trustee for the New Orphan Asylum for Colored Children, the Crawford Old Men's Home, and the Sallie McCall Industrial School of Cincinnati (also known as the Colored Industrial School of Cincinnati). He also worked in the real estate and coal business in Chicago. 

He had a second marriage to Mae Robinson, said to be a "millionaire heiress" who was the "the wealthiest negress in the United States" by 1925.

See also
African-American officeholders during and following the Reconstruction era

References

1847 births
1925 deaths
Republican Party members of the Ohio House of Representatives
African-American state legislators in Ohio
Educators from Ohio
Ohio lawyers
African-American businesspeople